Criminal Nation was an American hip-hop group whose members included D-Rob, Spade, Bumpy, MC Deff/Wojack, D-Wiz, Clee-Bone and Eugenius.

The group was active from 1990 to 1992 and then briefly in 2000.

Discography
1990: Release the Pressure Nastymix Records
1992: Trouble in the Hood Nastymix Records
2000: Resurrection Ocean Records

References

American hip hop groups
West Coast hip hop groups
Musical groups from Tacoma, Washington